"On the Bible" is a song by English group Deuce. It was released in Europe in July 1995

Track listings
 UK single (London Records – LONCD368)
 "On the Bible" (Radio Edit) - 4:45
 "On the Bible" (Franco And Grimm Remix) - 5:54
 "On the Bible" (Kenny C Remix) - 8:54
 "On the Bible" (Lazonby Secular Perversion) - 8:32

 Australian single (Central Station – CSR CD5 0154)
 "On the Bible" (Radio Edit) - 4:45
 "On the Bible" (TV Edit) - 3:30
 "On the Bible" (Wand 7" Edit) - 3:55
 "On the Bible" (Wand 12" Remix) - 7:49
 "On the Bible" (Kenny C Remix) - 8:54 
 "On the Bible" (Lazonby Secular Perversion) - 8:32

Charts

References

1995 singles
1995 songs
Warner Records singles
Songs written by Phil Harding (producer)
Songs written by Ian Curnow